Marie-Thérèse Armentero (born 13 November 1965) is a Swiss swimmer who won a bronze medal in the 50 m freestyle at the 1986 World Aquatics Championships. She competed at the 1984 and 1988 Summer Olympics with the best achievement of sixth place in the 4 × 100 m medley relay in 1984.

During 1986–88 she was studying and training at the University of Toronto. There she swam the fastest ever 50 m freestyle race in Canada, setting a Canadian Interuniversity Sport (CIS) record that stood for at least 18 years. She also won a silver medal at the 1987 Summer Universiade and nine Ontario Women's Interuniversity Athletic Association (OWIAA) and seven CIS titles. In 1988 she was chosen the CIS Female Swimmer of the Year. After retirement she competed in the masters category and in 2003 set a European record in the 50 m freestyle. In 2006, she was inducted to the University of Toronto Sports Hall of Fame.

References

1965 births
Living people
Swimmers at the 1984 Summer Olympics
Swimmers at the 1988 Summer Olympics
Olympic swimmers of Switzerland
Swiss female freestyle swimmers
University of Toronto alumni
World Aquatics Championships medalists in swimming
Universiade medalists in swimming
Universiade silver medalists for Switzerland
Medalists at the 1987 Summer Universiade
20th-century Swiss women